Wulf Bernard Kunkel (6 February 1923, Eichenau, Germany – 3 September 2013, Oakland, California) was a German-born American physicist, specializing in plasma physics, especially "the development of ion beams for plasma heating".
 
Kunkel attended the International Quaker School Eerde in Eerde, Ommen in the Netherlands. During the Second World War, he studied physics at the University of Amsterdam. After WW II ended, he studied physics at the University of California, Berkeley (UC Berkeley), where he graduated with bachelor's degree in 1948 and PhD in 1951. From 1951 to 1956 he worked at UC Berkeley's Institute of Engineering Research. In 1956 he joined the UC Radiation Laboratory (renamed in 1958 the Lawrence Berkeley National Laboratory, LBNL) and also became a lecturer in the Physics Department, UC Berkeley. There he was a full professor from 1967 to 1991, when he retired as professor emeritus. From 1971 to 1991 he served as leader of LBNL's fusion research program.

Kunkel was a Guggenheim Fellow for the two academic years 1955–1956 and 1972–1973. He was elected a Fellow of the American Physical Society in 1955. He received Germany's Alexander von Humboldt Award in 1982.
 

Upon his death he was survived by his widow, three children, and two grandchildren.

Selected publications
 
 
 
 

 
 
  1979 (This paper "describes the use and future of high-power neutral-beam injectors to heat plasma."

References

1923 births
2013 deaths
University of California, Berkeley alumni
University of California, Berkeley College of Letters and Science faculty
Lawrence Berkeley National Laboratory people
Plasma physicists
20th-century American physicists
20th-century German physicists
Fellows of the American Physical Society
German emigrants to the United States